Japan Today is a website that publishes wire articles, press releases, and photographs, as well as opinion and contract pieces, such as company profiles, in English.

References

External links
 

2000 establishments in Japan
English-language newspapers published in Japan
Newspapers published in Tokyo
Newspapers established in 2000